Magbaiamba Ndowahun is a chiefdom of Bombali District in the Northern Province of Sierra Leone. The principal town lies at Kagbere.

As of 2004 the chiefdom has a population of 8,655.

References

Chiefdoms of Sierra Leone
Northern Province, Sierra Leone